"The Other Boys" is a song performed by Australian twin sisters Nervo featuring  Kylie Minogue, Jake Shears and Nile Rodgers. It's included on their debut studio album, Collateral. The remix single was released on 23 October 2015.

Miriam Nervo said of the collaboration, "These guys [Kylie Minogue and Jake Shears] are such strong artists that they put their creative stamp on everything so I think it was a real creative thing, very natural, that just worked really well." adding "I love Niall's guitar bit! It's amazing, it just brought it to a whole new level, it was the icing on the cake."

Critical reception
Mike Wass of Idolator said "Nervo's production looks to the past for inspiration, but is definitely rooted in the here and now, while Kylie and Jake trade vocal blows on the soaring, gender-blind chorus." He later added, "The Other Boys" is an "irresistible, disco-tinged floor-filler".

Justin Harp from Digital Spy said "The floor-filler combines electro-pop with disco beats in a way that seems tailor-made for Minogue and Shears to duet."

Music video
The music video was filmed in August 2015 in London's Brick Lane. Minogue posted photos of the video shoot on her instagram account on 27 August. In it she is wearing  a vintage Comme des Garçons dress and Casadei boots. On 16 October, Nervo said on their Facebook page that they "Can't wait to show you guys the video".

The music video premiered on 28 October, via Ultra Music's YouTube page.

Track listing

Track listing 12" UK Edit

Charts

Release history

See also
 List of number-one dance singles of 2015 (U.S.)

References

2015 singles
2015 songs
Nervo (DJs) songs
Kylie Minogue songs
Nile Rodgers songs
Song recordings produced by Nervo (DJs)
Songs written by Fred Falke
Songs written by Miriam Nervo
Songs written by Nile Rodgers
Songs written by Olivia Nervo
Ultra Music singles